Gory Days is the second studio album by rapper Necro, released on November 13, 2001, by Psycho+Logical-Records. In this album, Necro emphasizes his death rap theme, rather than sex, such as in his 2005 album The Sexorcist. Two singles, "Bury You with Satan" and "Morbid", were released from the album.

The album was Necro's quickest selling release at the time. Featured guests on the album include Mr. Hyde, Goretex, Ill Bill, Captain Carnage and Kid Joe. The track "Circle of Tyrants" features all four members of the then-non-existent hip hop group Circle of Tyrants who named their group after the title of this collaboration. Members of the group include Necro, Mr. Hyde, Goretex and Ill Bill.

The single "Bury You with Satan" was subsequently remixed twice since this release; once in 2003 for Street Villains Vol. 1, with a new verse recorded exclusively for the remix, and again in 2005 for Street Villains Vol. 2. The songs, "Dead Body Disposal" and "Poetry in the Streets", were subsequently remixed only once since this release for Street Villains Vol. 1, with a new verse recorded exclusively for both remixes.

Track listing
All tracks produced by Necro
 "Bury You with Satan" – 4:01
 "World Gone Mad" – 4:50
 "Light My Fire" – 3:23
 "Circle of Tyrants" (featuring Mr. Hyde, Goretex, Ill Bill and Captain Carnage) – 4:51
 "Dead Body Disposal" – 5:43
 "You're All Dying" – 3:35
 "All Hotties Eat the Jizz" – 4:09
 "Scalpel - 3:55
 "12 King Pimp Commandments" – 4:09
 "Gory Days" – 3:15
 "Poetry in the Streets" (featuring Ill Bill) – 3:42
 "Don't Try To Ruin It" (featuring The Kid Joe) – 3:39
 "One Way or Another" – 3:33
 "Morbid" – 2:46
 "24 Shots" (Special Edition bonus track) – 3:59
 "Violins of Violence" (featuring Mr. Hyde, Special Edition bonus track)  – 3:34

Bonus DVD
A special edition reissue of the album released on October 28, 2002 contained a bonus DVD featuring all of Necro's music videos, short films produced by Necro Pictures, interviews, and more:

 BET Commercial
 Interview Pt. 1
 "Your Fuckin' Head Split" (Live at S.O.B.'s, NYC)
 Interview Pt. 2
 Rhyming Live On WKCR 89.9FM
 "I'm Sick of You" (Live at S.O.B.'s, NYC)
 Interview Pt. 3
 Necro On VH1
 "I Need Drugs" music video
 Behind the Scenes of the "I Need Drugs" music video
 "I Need Drugs" photo shoot
 Necro Playing With Hookers Pt. 1
 Interview Pt. 4
 Fuckin' With People
 "Rugged Shit" (Live at S.O.B.'s, NYC)
 The Devil Made Me Do it short film
 Fleabag short film
 "Get Me Dat Bread" skit
 Behind the Scenes of The Devil Made Me Do it
 Interview Pt. 5
 187 Reasonz Y short film
 Playing With Hookers Pt. 2
 "The Most Sadistic" (Live at S.O.B.'s, NYC)
 "Kid Joe" skits
 Interview Pt. 6
 Howie Freaking Out
 "Acapella Porn Rhyme" (Live at Downtime, NYC)
 "Ironman" skit
 Interview Pt. 7
 Gene Freaking Out
 "Rugged Shit" and "Hoe Blow" (Live at Brownie's, NYC)
 "Tito Blackjack" skit
 Interview Pt. 8

Gory Days Instrumentals

Gory Days Instrumentals is the instrumental version Gory Days, released on September 16, 2003, by Psycho+Logical-Records. It features instrumental versions of all 14 tracks from Gory Days, and instrumental versions of the special edition bonus tracks "24 Shots" and "Violins of Violence".

Track listing
 "Bury You with Satan" – 4:03
 "World Gone Mad" – 3:31
 "Light My Fire" – 3:24
 "Circle of Tyrants" – 5:02
 "Dead Body Disposal" – 5:36
 "You're All Dying" – 3:36
 "All Hotties Eat the Jizz" – 4:12
 "Scalpel" – 3:55
 "12 King Pimp Commandments" – 4:08
 "Gory Days" – 3:14
 "Poetry in the Streets" – 3:40
 "Don't Try to Ruin It" - 2:41
 "One Way or Another" – 3:33
 "Morbid" – 3:10
 "24 Shots" - 3:58
 "Violins of Violence" – 3:04

Samples and interpolations
"Light My Fire"
"Voyages" by Michel Polnareff
"Dead Body Disposal"
Dialogue from the film Snatch
"Mellisa" by Francis Lai
"One Way or Another"
"Dawning" by Triumvirat
"Circle of Tyrants"
"The Story of LSD" by Acid
"All Hotties Eat the Jizz"
"La Via Della Prostituzione" by Nico Fidenco
"Scalpel"
"Looks Like Twins" by Otis Spann
"12 King Pimp Commandments"
"Grigioperla" by Gianfranco Plenizio
"24 Shots"
"Dopping 2000" by Freedom Power Music For Film & Television
"Bury You with Satan"
"Suite" by Eleventh House
"Poetry in the Streets"
"Song of the Lamplighters" by Mzuiri

Personnel
 Necro – vocals, arranging, composing, writing, artwork, photography, production, mixing, bass on "Morbid"
 Elliot Thomas – engineering, mixing
 Duncan Stanbury – mastering
 Sabac Red – mixing
 Mike Lewis – photography
 Mr. Hyde – guest vocals, photography
 Captain Carnage – guest vocals
 Goretex – guest vocals
 Ill Bill – guest vocals
 Kid Joe – guest vocals

References

2001 albums
Necro (rapper) albums
Psycho+Logical-Records albums
Albums recorded at WKCR-FM